Lecithocera mylitacha is a moth in the family Lecithoceridae. It was described by Chun-Sheng Wu and You-Qiao Liu in 1993. It is found in Yunnan in China and in Thailand.

The wingspan is about 13 mm. The species resembles Lecithocera combusta, but the forewings are light with a pattern.

References

Moths described in 1993
mylitacha